The 1993 Pacific hurricane season included more than double the average number of major hurricanes – Category 3 or stronger cyclones on the Saffir–Simpson scale. This activity was the result of an El Niño event, which is the main factor contributing to above-average activity across the Pacific basin. The season featured 15 named storms, 11 hurricanes, and 9 major hurricanes. While the number of named storms was near the long-term average, the number of hurricanes was above the average of 8, and the number of major hurricanes far exceeded the long-term average of 4. Seasonal activity began on May 17 and ended on November 8, within the confines of a traditional hurricane season which begins on May 15 in the East Pacific and June 1 in the Central Pacific. The season ends on November 30 in both basins. These dates conventionally delimit the period during each year when most tropical cyclones form.

A majority of the season's storms formed from tropical waves between 10°N and southern coast of Mexico. While they generally followed the typical path away from Mexico before dissipating over cooler waters near 25°N, a persistent upper-level trough across the Western United States periodically curved storms into land. Tropical Storm Beatriz produced heavy rainfall and downed trees across Southern Mexico, causing 6 fatalities. In July, Hurricane Calvin struck Southwestern Mexico, prompting the evacuation of 42,000 residents, the displacement of 1,600 people, and 37 deaths. This area was later affected by Hurricane Jova in September, which flooded houses. Hurricanes Dora, Eugene, and Fernanda produced generally minor rainfall across the Hawaiian Islands, alleviating drought conditions. However, their large swells caused damage to beachfront homes and caused the death of a fisherman offshore. Hurricane Hilary produced heavy rainfall across portions of Mexico and California in August. The next month, Hurricane Lidia destroyed hundreds of homes, displaced over 10,000 people, and resulted in 7 deaths.

Storms

Hurricane Adrian 

A low-pressure area and associated convection developed within the Intertropical Convergence Zone as early as June 9. Additionally, a tropical wave from Africa is estimated to have entered the East Pacific basin around this time. The combination of disturbances led to the formation of a tropical depression on June 11. Embedded within weak steering flow, the depression initially drifted towards the west and began to organize amid warm sea surface temperatures and low wind shear. Eighteen hours after formation, the depression strengthened into Tropical Storm Adrian. Turning towards the northwest, Adrian gradually strengthened to attain hurricane status by 12:00 UTC on June 15. The storm reached a peak intensity of  early the next day. It veered toward the southeast, encountering stronger wind shear which began to take toll on the cyclone. The system became nearly stationary and dissipated at 1800 UTC on June 19 without any effects to land.

Tropical Storm Beatriz 

On June 14, satellite imagery revealed an increase in thunderstorm activity to the south of the Gulf of Tehuantepec, which may have been aided by the passage of a tropical wave. Moving little, a broad surface low developed with the cloud mass. Although the disturbance remained disorganized, a second tropical wave moved into the region on June 18, when the cloudiness there became better concentrated. Quickly strengthening, the depression intensified into Tropical Storm Beatriz six hours later.

Shortly thereafter, the system made landfall near Puerto Escondido, Oaxaca, and rapidly weakened to a tropical depression over the mountainous terrain of Mexico. Beatriz dissipated at 06:00 UTC on June 20, although the remnant cloudiness and associated convection from the storm spread across portions of the western Gulf of Mexico that same day. Beatriz caused extensive damage in southwest Mexico, especially from heavy rains and flooding. Six deaths were reported in the Mexican states of Morelos and Veracruz from flooding and downed trees attributed to Beatriz.

Tropical Depression Three-E 

A large area of disturbed weather persisted south of Mexico for several days, perhaps enhanced by a westward-moving tropical wave that departed Africa on June 12. Although the depression developed a symmetrical area of convection on June 30, it soon passed over cooler ocean waters and began to become disheveled. The system dissipated a short distance north of La Paz, Baja California Sur, around 00:00 UTC on July 2.

As the designated system paralleled Mexico, it contributed to multiple days of rainfall, including in Acapulco, Guerrero where  fell between June 26–29. Satellite rainfall estimates exceeded  on June 28. No deaths or damage were reported, but some 300 families were evacuated in an unspecified area of the country.

Hurricane Calvin 

Hurricane Calvin was first identified as an area of disturbed weather south of the Gulf of Tehuantepec on July 2. The depression intensified into Tropical Storm Calvin twelve hours later. After initially tracking westward, Calvin turned north and attained hurricane status before reinstating a westward component. The hurricane rapidly weakened and emerged back offshore in a much weakened state. Now a tropical depression, Calvin made its final landfall just south of La Paz before dissipating over cold waters in the region.

In Acapulco, waves in excess of  affected the city. A state of emergency was declared in at least ten states in Mexico following Calvin's passage, and the Mexican Defense Department said that 42,063 people were evacuated in 11 states. Additionally, at least 1,600 people were left homeless. Rough seas near Lázaro Cárdenas caused all  of sulfuric acid to leak aboard the previously beached cargo tanker, Betula. Calvin was responsible for $32 million in damage. It killed 37 people, of which most deaths were the result of heavy rainfall.

Hurricane Dora 

A tropical wave departed Africa on June 27 and reached the East Pacific on June 9. It began to show signs of organization and developed into a tropical depression at 12:00 UTC on July 14. The system followed a west to west-northwest course for much of its duration under the influence of a subtropical ridge. It intensified into Tropical Storm Dora at 18:00 UTC and further strengthened to a hurricane 30 hours later. After maintaining that strength for 18 hours, the cyclone encountered an upper-level trough to its west, which caused an abrupt uptick in wind shear while Dora simultaneously moved over colder waters. The remnants of Dora interacted with a cold-core low near those islands, causing an outbreak of thunderstorms that alleviated ongoing drought conditions there.

Hurricane Eugene 

Tropical Depression Six-E developed south-southwest of the Baja California Peninsula at 18:00 UTC on July 15. Its genesis may have been related to a tropical wave that departed Africa on June 30 and reached the vicinity of the cyclone that day. After banding features improved, the depression was upgraded to Tropical Storm Eugene at 12:00 UTC on July 16. Eugene alternated on a west to northwest course for several days and gradually intensified, becoming a hurricane around 06:00 UTC on July 17 and a major hurricane by 00:00 UTC on July 18. The system peaked with winds of  the next day, when it displayed a well-defined eye pattern on satellite. As the system peaked, it abruptly slowed and turned to the northwest under the influence of a cold-core low.

After peak intensity, Eugene began to weaken due to increasing wind shear and cooler ocean waters. It entered the Central Pacific on July 22 and continued to lose organization on satellite, making a later landfall on the southern side of the Big Island at 12:00 UTC on July 24 as a tropical depression. Across the Hawaiian Islands, the system produced beneficial rainfall and no major damage, though broken tree limbs and minor power outages were reported. A 45-year-old fisherman may have drowned when his  boat was smashed in the storm's rough seas. Eugene continued rapidly westward past Hawaii and dissipated on July 25.

Hurricane Keoni 

An area of disturbed weather developed into Tropical Depression One-C at 00:00 UTC on August 9. The depression remained steady state until 18:00 UTC on August 12, at which time it intensified into Tropical Storm Keoni. The cyclone moved west-northwest and continued to gain organization, becoming a hurricane around 18:00 UTC on August 14 and a major hurricane by 06:00 UTC on August 16. The hurricane continued west-northwest, and although it had weakened substantially, it crossed the International Date Line around 18:00 UTC on August 19, when it was reclassified as a typhoon. In the West Pacific, the system alternated between Category 1–3 intensity for a while. It executed clockwise loops along the northern fringes of Typhoon Vernon before losing its status as a tropical cyclone on August 28. The remnant circulation continued to persist north of Wake Island into early September.

Hurricane Fernanda 

Fernanda formed from a tropical wave that moved off Africa on July 28 and crossed into the East Pacific. It became Tropical Storm Fernanda later that day and strengthened into a hurricane on August 10. The potent hurricane crossed into the Central Pacific on August 14. Fernanda later curved to the northwest beginning on August 16 ahead of an upper-level trough. It crossed into higher wind shear and cooler waters, transitioning into an extratropical cyclone on August 19. The remnant circulation merged with a frontal boundary two days later.

Although it did not make landfall in the Hawaiian Islands, Fernanda's close approach prompted a hurricane warning for the Big Island and a hurricane watch elsewhere in the islands. Heavy surf affected the islands, with waves as high as  reported on Kauai. These swells inflicted damage to shoreline roads on all of the islands, allowing water intrusion into some homes and washing one house several feet off its foundation. Many beach parks were also inundated. Moisture induced by the interaction of Fernanda and an upper-level trough produced rainfall across the islands, leading to localized flooding on Kauai. In total, Fernanda caused $5 million in damage to the Hawaiian Islands.

Hurricane Greg 

The system moved inland and dissipated over the mountainous terrain of Central America, but an area of convection emerged into the East Pacific on August 11. The disturbance moved west and coalesced once again, developing into a tropical depression around 00:00 UTC on August 15 and further strengthening into Tropical Storm Greg twelve hours later. The system continued to intensify as it moved west-northwest parallel to the Mexico coastline, attaining hurricane status at 12:00 UTC on August 16 when an eye was first observable on satellite imagery. The system reached Category 2 strength on August 16 but weakened thereafter. Following a brief reprieve in development, Greg began to intensify rapidly on August 18, and it became yet another major hurricane at 06:00 UTC on August 19. The eye became obscured from view shortly thereafter, an indication that the storm had begun a weakening trend. However, owing to its roughly parallel track to  ocean waters, Greg only slowly weakened over ensuing days. The cyclone curved west-southwest and crossed into the Central Pacific as a tropical depression on August 28.

Hurricane Hilary 

Hilary originated from a tropical wave that crossed Central America on August 14. Three days after entering the East Pacific, the wave was sufficiently organized to be declared Tropical Depression Nine-E. The system moved west and then west-northwest around a ridge to its northeast while gradually strengthening. It developed into Tropical Storm Hilary on August 18 and attained hurricane status the next day. The system displayed first hints of an eye on August 20, which became well-defined the next day.

After August 23, the hurricane executed a small counter-clockwise loop as it underwent binary interaction with the newly developed Tropical Storm Irwin. Hilary then took a northerly track for the remainder of its existence, bringing the system over cooler waters and causing weakening. The storm made two landfalls in Mexico, one in Baja California Sur on August 25 and again near Hermosillo, Sonora, the following day. The remnants of Hilary were last noted over the northern Gulf of California on August 27.

Tropical Storm Irwin 

A tropical wave spawned Tropical Storm Cindy in the Atlantic and continued west, likely leading to an uptick in convection south of the Gulf of Tehuantepec on August 20. Around 06:00 UTC the next day, that disturbance organized into a tropical depression; six hours later, it developed into Tropical Storm Irwin. The system moved northwest parallel to the coastline of Mexico and underwent binary interaction with nearby Hurricane Hilary. That stronger, larger system absorbed Irwin around 18:00 UTC on August 22.

Hurricane Jova 

A tropical wave moved off Africa on August 14 and remained a distinct feature on its voyage across the Atlantic. The wave spawned an area of disturbed weather south of Mexico that began to show signs of organization by August 26. Three days later, at 00:00 UTC, the system developed into a tropical depression. An upper-level anticyclone provided a low wind shear environment around the cyclone, facilitating its quick intensification over later days. It became Tropical Storm Jova at 18:00 UTC on August 29, a hurricane around 06:00 UTC on August 31, and a major hurricane – the fifth in August alone – eighteen hours later. The system encountered increasingly cool waters as it moved northwest parallel to the Mexico coastline and began to weaken accordingly, though this process was temporarily interrupted by a reappearance of its eye on September 2 and restrengthening into a Category 2 hurricane on September 3. The outer bands of Jova produced heavy rainfall in Durango, particular in its capital Durango City, prompting the evacuation of 1,500 people across 20 neighborhoods because of flooded homes.

Hurricane Kenneth 

On August 30, a tropical disturbance developed south of Panama. Around 12:00 UTC on September 5, the system organized into a tropical depression as thunderstorms coalesced into loosely defined rainbands. These bands increased in intensity over subsequent hours, signaling the cyclone's intensification into Tropical Storm Kenneth by 06:00 UTC on September 6. Over the coming days, the cyclone moved on a sinussoidal-like path across the East Pacific, alternating between west and west-northwest. On September 8, Kenneth attained hurricane strength, which was followed by its development into a major hurricane on September 10, shortly after an eye first appeared on satellite. Kenneth displayed a small but well-defined eye embedded within a very cold central dense overcast at this time. Soon, the cyclone encountered cooler waters and southwesterly wind shear on its northwest trek, which caused the system to decay. Kenneth dissipated at 00:00 UTC on September 18, though its remnant circulation persisted for a few more days.

Hurricane Lidia 

A tropical wave departed Africa on August 24 and reached the East Pacific on September 4, where it began to organize. The system congealed into a tropical depression by 12:00 UTC on September 8 after it developed tightly curled rainbands. It intensified into Tropical Storm Lidia six hours after formation, and it became a hurricane by 06:00 UTC on September 10. The cyclone paralleled the coastline of Mexico on a west-northwest course, and it continued to strengthen as outflow expanded in all directions. Satellite imagery around this time showed a hurricane with a large, well-defined eye surrounded by intense convection. After peak, the cyclone recurved northeast ahead of an upper-level trough, bringing Lidia onshore south-southwest of Culiacan, Sinaloa, with winds of  around 08:00 UTC on September 13. The system dissipated over central Texas on September 14 as it merged with a cold front.

Though no measurements were recorded, winds near hurricane force were reported near the storm's landfall point. The combination of wind and rain were said to have demolished hundreds of shanty-style houses in the Mazatlan area. Across Durango, 16 homes were destroyed and some 4,000 others were damaged. In Nayarit, agriculture was declared a complete loss across four counties, and in Sinaloa, about 1,200 head of cattle were killed. A  broadcasting tower in Culiacan was toppled. At least 10,000 people were displaced throughout Mexico. Up to seven people were reportedly killed, including one from electrocution and one from the collapse of a structure. One person was injured as well.

Tropical Depression Fourteen-E 

The large circulation of the Atlantic's Hurricane Gert survived its trek over Mexico and re-emerged into the East Pacific on September 21. It organized offshore and as such was reclassified as Tropical Depression Fourteen-E at 00:00 UTC on September 22. The system moved west to west-northwest initially, and it developed a small collection of thunderstorms the next day that suggested it was close to tropical storm intensity. The depression became increasingly disorganized by September 24, though, and it curved southwest in a weakened state. The cyclone dissipated around 00:00 UTC on September 26.

Tropical Storm Max 

Max's origin appears to be related to an area of convection south of Mexico that likely spawned from a tropical wave. The disturbance formed around 00:00 UTC on September 30 and intensified into Tropical Storm Max twelve hours later. In close proximity to strong upper-level winds, the newly designated cyclone was stripped it of its convection and weakened back to tropical depression strength on October 1. As it moved erratically over the open East Pacific, it soon became nestled underneath an expansive anticyclone aloft, which provided a low wind shear environment. Throughout its duration, the system moved erratically as it interacted with the larger circulation of Tropical Storm Norma to the east until finally it was absorbed by that cyclone around 00:00 UTC on October 4.

Tropical Storm Norma 

A large area of disturbed weather was identified south of Acapulco on September 29, potentially spawned by a tropical wave that left Africa 12 days earlier. The system was originally embedded underneath a large anticyclone aloft, which provided a low wind shear environment for it to become Tropical Storm Norma on October 3 and reach peak winds of  the next day. Around this time, the system absorbed the smaller Tropical Storm Max. Norma moved generally northwest and encountered strong southwesterly wind shear, which caused it to dissipate after 18:00 UTC on October 6.

Tropical Depression Seventeen-E 

At 18:00 UTC on October 11, the season's final tropical depression formed over the East Pacific and moved northwest. The system was poorly organized, with a circulation elongated west to east, and embedded within an environment of strong wind shear. Thus, it never became a tropical storm and instead dissipated around 00:00 UTC on October 14.

Storm names 
The following names were used for named storms that formed in the eastern Pacific in 1993. Names that were not assigned are marked in gray.

For storms that form in the Central Pacific Hurricane Center's area of responsibility, encompassing the area between 140 degrees west and the International Date Line, all names are used in a series of four rotating lists.

Season effects 
This is a table of all the storms that have formed in the 1993 Pacific hurricane season. It includes their duration, names, landfall(s), denoted in parentheses, damages, and death totals. Deaths in parentheses are additional and indirect (an example of an indirect death would be a traffic accident), but were still related to that storm. Damage and deaths include totals while the storm was extratropical, a wave, or a low, and all the damage figures are in 1993 USD.

See also 

 List of Pacific hurricanes
 Pacific hurricane season
 1993 Atlantic hurricane season
 1993 Pacific typhoon season
 1993 North Indian Ocean cyclone season
 South-West Indian Ocean cyclone season: 1992–93, 1993–94
 Australian region cyclone season: 1992–93, 1993–94
 South Pacific cyclone season: 1992–93, 1993–94

References

External links 
 NHC 1993 Pacific hurricane season archive

 
Pacific hurricane seasons
Articles which contain graphical timelines